Local elections were held in Romania on 2 June 1996 and a runoff for mayors on 16 June 1996.

Results

Mayors 

With respect to the results for the mayoral seats, those were as follows:

Electoral map

References

External links
Legislatia referitoare la alegerile locale din Romania
Alegeri locale iunie 1996, Doina Lecea, ROMPRES, preluat de presalibera.ro

Local election, 1996
1996 elections in Romania
June 1996 events in Europe